Azalia is an unincorporated community in Sand Creek Township, Bartholomew County, in the U.S. state of Indiana.

History
Officially platted on April 1, 1831, a post office was established at Azalia in 1833 and remained in operation until it was discontinued in 1934. It was named for the flowering shrub azalea.

Geography

Demographics

Azalia last appeared in the U.S. Census as a separately-returned community in 1870, when it had a reported population of 91 residents.

References

Unincorporated communities in Bartholomew County, Indiana
Unincorporated communities in Indiana